Nejanilini Lake Airport  is located adjacent to Nejanilini Lake, Manitoba, Canada and serves The Lodge at Little Duck (formerly known as "Nejanilini Lake Lodge").

References

Registered aerodromes in Manitoba